Australia participated in the Junior Eurovision Song Contest 2016 which took place on 20 November 2016, in Valletta, Malta. Special Broadcasting Service (SBS) was responsible for organising their entry for the contest. Alexa Curtis was internally selected to represent Australia with the song "We Are".

Background

Before Junior Eurovision

The Australian broadcaster announced on 12 September 2016, that they would be participating at the contest to be held in Valletta, Malta. On 29 September 2016, it was announced that Alexa Curtis had been internally chosen by the broadcaster to represent Australia. Curtis will perform the song "We Are", which was premiered on 7 October 2016.

Artist and song information

Alexa Curtis

Alexa Curtis (born 4 January 2004) is an Australian singer who won The Voice Kids Australia in 2014. She won through Team Delta and is now signed to Universal Music Australia. She will represent Australia in the Junior Eurovision Song Contest 2016 with the song "We Are".

In 2012, Alexa appeared in a production of Oliver! alongside her brother, Aidan. She appeared twice in the 2014 Schools Spectacular, first performing with her Voice Kids co-stars, then duetting with The Voice winner Anja Nissen. In 2014, she performed with a small group of The Voice Kids at Vision Australia's Carols by Candlelight. In 2015, she performed at the IGA Lord Mayor's Christmas Carols appearing twice, once as a solo performer, then duetting with Napoleon 'Polo' Cummings. In March 2016, she sang the opening theme song for six episodes of The Powerpuff Girls on Cartoon Network Australia.

We Are
"We Are" represented Australia during the Junior Eurovision Song Contest 2016. It was composed and written by Ali Tamposi, Tania Doko and Boi-1da.

At Junior Eurovision
During the opening ceremony and the running order draw which took place on 14 November 2016, Australia was drawn to perform fourteenth on 20 November 2016, following Israel and preceding the Netherlands.

The final will be broadcast in Australia on SBS One.

Final

Voting
During the press conference for the Junior Eurovision Song Contest 2016, held in Stockholm, the Reference Group announced several changes to the voting format for the 2016 contest. Previously, points had been awarded based on a combination of 50% National juries and 50% televoting, with one more set of points also given out by a 'Kids' Jury'. For the first time since the inauguration of the contest the voting procedure will not include a public televote. Following these results, three expert jurors will also announce their points from 1–8, 10, and 12. These professional jurors are: Christer Björkman, Mads Grimstad, and Jedward.

References

Junior Eurovision Song Contest
Australia
Junior